Dominic Speakman (born 22 March 1994) is a former rugby league footballer who most recently played for Dewsbury Rams in the Betfred Championship.

He previously played for St Helens in the Super League. Speakman also played for the Rochdale Hornets and the North Wales Crusaders in the third tier, and the Barrow Raiders, Dewsbury Rams and the Widnes Vikings in the Championship.

Career
His début Super League match was on his 19th birthday in the game against the Salford.

He signed for Barrow Raiders in November 2013. The former England Under 16 and Under 18 International also appeared seven times for the Rochdale Hornets on Dual-Registration during 2013. In 2014, Speakman made 18 appearances for the Barrow Raiders before a loan move to the North Wales Crusaders. Speakman has since emigrated to Australia. In September 2022, Speakman announced his retirement from Rugby league after 6 years.

References

External links
Dewsbury Rams profile
Saints Heritage Society profile

1994 births
Living people
Barrow Raiders players
Dewsbury Rams players
English rugby league players
North Wales Crusaders players
Rochdale Hornets players
Rugby league hookers
St Helens R.F.C. players
Widnes Vikings players